Gadoxetic acid is a gadolinium-based MRI contrast agent. Its salt, gadoxetate disodium, is marketed as Primovist in Europe and Eovist in the United States by Bayer HealthCare Pharmaceuticals.

Medical uses
It is used to increase the T1 signal intensity while imaging the liver lesions such as benign cysts, haemangioma, and liver cancer. It is excreted into bile by active secretion.

Pharmacokinetics
In those with end-stage renal failure, the clearance rate is only 17% with terminal half-life of 12 times longer than the those with normal renal function.

See also

 Gadobenic acid
 Gadopentetic acid

References

External links 
 
 

MRI contrast agents
Organogadolinium compounds
Phenol ethers